James C. Watters (1869-1947) was a Scottish-Canadian coal miner and trade union leader.

Born in Edinburgh, Watters emigrated to Canada, eventually ending up in British Columbia. In that province, he worked as a coal miner and, in 1910, was elected founding president of the BC Federation of Labour. A year later, he was elected president of the Trades and Labor Congress of Canada, a position he held until losing re-election in 1918.

References

1869 births
1947 deaths

Trade unionists from British Columbia
Trade unionists from Edinburgh
Canadian coal miners
Scottish emigrants to Canada

Presidents of the Trades and Labor Congress of Canada